AzarAb Industries is an Iranian manufacturing corporation that constructs power plants, factories, petrochemical plants and sugar, oil and gas refineries that is located in Arak. As of 2005, AzarAb Industries, employed more than 2,500 people.

Their main products are air preheaters, boilers, butterfly valves, water turbines, reactors, fractionating columns and pressure vessels.

Some of the projects the corporation has worked on are:
 Shahid Rajaie 1000 M.W. Thermal Power Plant, Iran
 Gilan 810 M.W. Combined Cycle Power Plant, Iran
 Abadan Petrochemical Plant, Iran

The corporation has ISO 9001 certification and is a member of the Association of Iran Industry Equipment Manufacturers.

References

   
  Ibid.

External links
 

Companies listed on the Tehran Stock Exchange
Iranian brands
Engineering companies of Iran
Nuclear technology companies of Iran
Manufacturing companies of Iran
Water turbine manufacturers
Industrial machine manufacturers
Engine manufacturers of Iran
Companies based in Arak
Iranian entities subject to the U.S. Department of the Treasury sanctions